Voronezh Oblast is a federal subject of Russia (an oblast). Its administrative center is the city of Voronezh. Its population was 2,308,792 as of the 2021 Census.

Geography
Voronezh Oblast borders internally with Belgorod Oblast, Kursk Oblast, Lipetsk Oblast, Tambov Oblast, Saratov Oblast, Volgograd Oblast and Rostov Oblast and internationally with Ukraine.

Voronezh Oblast is located in the central belt of the European part of Russia, in a very advantageous strategic location, transport links to the site going to the industrial regions of Russia. Within the radius (12 hours of driving 80 km/h) 960 kilometers around Voronezh more than 50% of the population Russia, and 40% in Ukraine live.

The area of the region - 52.4 thousand km2, which is about one third of the whole area of Central Black Earth Region. The length of the region from north to south - 277.5 km, and from west to east - 352 km. Much of the area is steppe, among the predominant soil fertile soil black earth.

Main rivers

The oblast has 738 lakes and ponds in 2408, in 1343 the river flows over 10 km long. The main river is the Don, 530 of its 1,870 km flows through the area, forming a drainage area of 422,000 square kilometers.

Don
Voronezh
Bityug
Khopyor

Climate

History
The oblast was established on June 13, 1934.

On 21 May 1998 Voronezh alongside Amur, Ivanovo, Kostroma Oblast, and the Mari El Republic signed a power-sharing agreement with the federal government, granting it autonomy. This agreement would be abolished on 22 February 2002.

Kostyonki, which is located within the Voronezh Oblast, is known for high concentration of cultural remains of anatomically modern humans from the beginning of the Upper Paleolithic era. The first and oldest camp rights in Europe.
A layer of Campanian volcanic ash from about 40,000 years ago has been found above some of the finds, showing that "unknown humans" inhabited the site before this. The earliest directly dated human remains from this site are dated to 32,600 ± 1,100 14C years and consist of tibia and fibula, with traits classifying the bones to European early modern humans. 

In 2009, DNA was extracted from the remains of a male hunter-gatherer who lived 40,000 years BP and died aged 20–25.  His maternal lineage was found to be U2. He was buried in an oval pit in a crouched position and covered with red ochre.

Administrative divisions

Economy
The structure of Voronezh Oblast the industrial-agrarian. As part of the industry is dominated by mechanical engineering, power systems engineering, food industry, processing industry of agricultural raw materials, they account for 4/5 of the total volume of industrial output. Industry specialization of the region is the food industry (27%), second place is occupied by engineering and metalworking (23%), third place - power (18%).

Industry of the region specializes in the production of machine tools, oil and gas equipment, rocket engines, metal bridge structures, press-forging and mining equipment, electronic equipment, passenger aircraft Airbus.

The largest companies in the region include Sozvezdie (revenues of $ million in 2017), Molvest (dairy industry; $ million), Voronezhsintezkauchuk (Sibur group; $ million), the Russian branch of COFCO Group ($ million).

Agriculture

Voronezh Oblast is a major supplier of agricultural products.  For the first time in the history of farming region in 2011 produced record crops: sugar beet (factory) - 6,992 thousand. Tons (3.9 times more than in 2010) and sunflower - 1,002 thousand tons (2, 4 times more than in 2010)
2014 Voronezh Oblast ranked first in Russia in terms of gross harvest of potatoes, in farms of all categories have been collected 1.757 million tons of potatoes.

In general, the profile of agriculture - with crops of sunflowers and grain crops, dairy and beef cattle, pigs. Beet, sugar beet industry in Voronezh Oblast in terms of gross production of sugar beets and making sugar beet is one of the largest in the country. In 2014, sugar mills were produced 495.1 ths. tons of sugar.

Milk production in Voronezh Oblast in 2013 increased by 1.8% - up to 755,700 tons. In 2014 it increased by 4.2% to ↗788 000 tons, according to this indicator Voronezh Oblast takes first place in the Central Federal District. Milk yield per cow dairy herd in 2014 increased by 10.9% and amounted to 5545 kg.

Politics

During the Soviet period, the high authority in the oblast was shared between three persons: The first secretary of the Voronezh CPSU Committee (who in reality had the biggest authority), the chairman of the oblast Soviet (legislative power), and the Chairman of the oblast Executive Committee (executive power). Since 1991, CPSU lost all the power, and the head of the Oblast administration, and eventually the governor was appointed/elected alongside elected regional parliament.

The Charter of Voronezh Oblast is the fundamental law of the region. The Legislative Assembly of Voronezh Oblast is the province's standing legislative (representative) body. The Legislative Assembly exercises its authority by passing laws, resolutions, and other legal acts and by supervising the implementation and observance of the laws and other legal acts passed by it. The highest executive body is the Oblast Government, which includes territorial executive bodies such as district administrations, committees, and commissions that facilitate development and run the day to day matters of the province. The Oblast administration supports the activities of the Governor who is the highest official and acts as guarantor of the observance of the oblast Charter in accordance with the Constitution of Russia.

Demographics

Population: 

Births (2012): 25 374 (Birth rate: 10.9)
Deaths (2012): 36 174 (Death rate: 15.6)

2009 - 1.37 | 2010 - 1.36 | 2011 - 1.36 | 2012 - 1.45 | 2013 - 1.44 | 2014 - 1.47 | 2015 - 1.52 | 2016 - 1.48(e)

Settlements

Religion

According to a 2012 survey 62% of the population of Voronezh Oblast adheres to the Russian Orthodox Church, and 3.4% are unaffiliated Christians. In addition, 21.5% of the population deems itself to be "spiritual but not religious", 6% is atheist, and 7.1% follows other religions or did not give an answer to the question.

Notable people 
 Pavel Cherenkov, co-recipient of the 1958 Nobel Prize in Physics
 Alexandra Pavlovna Biryukova, 2nd woman appointed to the Politburo of the Communist Party of the Soviet Union

See also
List of Chairmen of the Voronezh Oblast Duma

References

Notes

Sources

External links

 Official website of Voronezh Oblast 
Central Eurasian Information Resource: Images of Voronezh Oblast - University of Washington Digital Collections

 
States and territories established in 1934
1934 establishments in Russia
Oblasts of Russia